The Plymouth Brethren or Assemblies of Brethren are a low church and non-conformist Christian movement whose history can be traced back to Dublin, Ireland, in the mid to late 1820s, where it originated from Anglicanism. The group emphasizes sola scriptura, the belief that the Bible is the only authority for church doctrine and practice. Plymouth Brethren generally see themselves as a network of like-minded free churches, not as a Christian denomination.

History

The Brethren movement began in Dublin, Ireland, where several groups of Christians met informally to celebrate the Lord's Supper together, the first meeting being in 1825. The central figures were Anthony Norris Groves, a dentist studying theology at Trinity College; Edward Cronin, studying medicine, John Nelson Darby, a curate in County Wicklow; and John Gifford Bellett, a lawyer who brought them together. They did not have any liturgy, order of service, or even any ministers; in their view, since their guide was "the Bible alone" they sought to do it according to their own interpretation of the biblical text.

An important early stimulus was the study of prophecy, which was the subject of a number of annual meetings at Powerscourt House in County Wicklow starting in 1831. Lady Powerscourt had attended Henry Drummond's prophecy conferences at Albury Park, and Darby was espousing the same pre-tribulational view in 1831 as Edward Irving. Many people came to these meetings who became important in the English movement, including Benjamin Wills Newton and George Müller.

The two main but conflicting aspirations of the movement were to create a holy and pure fellowship on one hand, and to allow all Christians into fellowship on the other. Believers in the movement felt that the established Church of England had abandoned or distorted many of the ancient traditions of Christendom, following decades of dissent and the expansion of Methodism and political revolutions in the United States and France. People in the movement wanted simply to meet together in the name of the Lord Jesus Christ without reference to denominational differences.

The first meeting in England was held in December 1831 in Plymouth, Devon. It was organised primarily by George Wigram, Benjamin Wills Newton, and John Nelson Darby. The movement soon spread throughout the United Kingdom, and the assembly in Plymouth had more than 1,000 people in fellowship in 1845. They became known as "the brethren from Plymouth" and were soon simply called "Plymouth Brethren". The term Darbyites is also used, especially when describing the Exclusive branch which has a more pronounced influence from Darby. Many within the movement refuse to accept any name other than "Christian".

In 1845, Darby returned from an extended visit to Switzerland where he had achieved considerable success planting churches. He returned to Plymouth where Newton was in control, and he disagreed with some details in a book that Newton had published concerning the tribulation that was coming. He also objected to Newton's place as an elder in the Plymouth meeting. But several attempts to settle the quarrel in the presence of other brethren failed to produce any clear result. Two years later, Darby attacked Newton over a lecture that Newton had given on the 6th Psalm, and an exchange of tracts followed. Newton retracted some of his statements, but he eventually left Plymouth and established another chapel in London.

Darby had instituted a second meeting at Plymouth, and he complained of the Bristol Bethesda assembly in 1848, in which George Müller was prominent; he was concerned because they had accepted a member from Ebrington Street, Newton's original chapel. Bethesda investigated the individual but defended their decision, and Darby was not satisfied. He issued a circular on 26 August 1848, cutting off Bethesda and all assemblies who received anyone who went there. This defined the essential characteristic of "exclusivism" which he pursued for the rest of his life.

The Exclusive Brethren experienced many subsequent splits, scatterings, and recombinations. The Open Brethren also suffered one split (concerning the autonomy of assemblies) which occurred at different times in different parts of the world. Nevertheless, both the Exclusive and the Open Brethren continued to expand their congregations, with the opens expanding more rapidly than the exclusives.

Darby visited Exclusive assemblies in America seven times between 1862 and 1877. Itinerant preachers from Scotland and Ireland established most of the early Open Brethren assemblies in America in the second half of the 19th century.

Open Brethren

The best-known and oldest distinction between Open assemblies is in the nature of relationships among their local churches. Open Brethren assemblies function as networks of like-minded independent local churches. Brethren generally feel an obligation to recognize and adhere to the disciplinary actions of other associated assemblies. Conversely, Open assemblies aware of that disciplining would not automatically feel a binding obligation to support it, treating each case on its own merit. Reasons for being put under discipline by both the Open and Exclusive Brethren include disseminating gross Scriptural or doctrinal error or being involved in unscriptural behavior. Being accused of illegal financial dealings may also result in being put under discipline.

Another less clear difference between assemblies lies in their approaches to collaborating with other Christians. Many Open Brethren will hold gospel meetings, youth events, or other activities in partnership with non-Brethren Evangelical Christian churches. More conservative Brethren tend to not support activities outside their own meetings.

International Brethren Conferences on Mission (IBCM) were founded in 1993 in Singapore by unions of churches from various countries. According to an IBCM Network census released in 2020, they claimed 40,000 churches and 2,700,000 members in 155 countries.

Exclusive Brethren

Exclusive Brethren have remained attached to Darby's doctrine. They are more interdependent, more conservative with a propensity for a dress code, very attached to the spontaneity of worship and preaching. They form several more or less compartmentalized circles of communion, from the most moderate to the narrowest. The movement has a Protestant theology and recognizes infant baptism. Around 40,000 worldwide in 2012, "close" brothers are often referred to as Darbyists, but rarely refer to themselves as such.

Plymouth Brethren Christian Church

The term Exclusive Brethren is most commonly used in the media to describe one separatist group known as Taylor-Hales Brethren, who now call themselves the Plymouth Brethren Christian Church (PBCC). The majority of Christians known as Exclusive Brethren are not connected with the Taylor-Hales group, who are known for their extreme interpretation of separation from evil and their belief of what constitutes fellowship. In their view, fellowship includes dining out, business and professional partnerships, membership of clubs, etc., rather than just the act of Communion (Lord's Supper), so these activities are done only with other members.

The group called the Raven Brethren (named for prominent Exclusive leader F.E. Raven) seceded from the Raven-Taylor-Hales group and are less strict and isolationist. Exclusive Brethren groups who are not affiliated with PBCC prefer being referred to as Closed rather than Exclusive brethren to avoid any connection with these more strident groups.

Brethren labels and distinctions

Terminology which sometimes confuses Brethren and non-Brethren alike is the distinction between the Open assemblies, usually called "Chapels", and the Closed assemblies (non-Exclusive), called "Gospel Halls." Contrary to common misconceptions, those traditionally known as the "Closed Brethren" are not a part of the Exclusive Brethren, but are rather a very conservative subset of the Open Brethren. The Gospel Halls regard reception to the assembly as a serious matter. One is not received to the Lord's Supper but to the fellowship of the assembly. This is important because the Lord's Supper is for believers, not unbelievers.

Some chapels, on the other hand, will allow practically anyone to participate who walks in and says that he is a Christian, based on the newcomer's profession of faith. Such assemblies are said to have an "open table" approach to strangers. Gospel Hall Brethren, on the other hand, generally believe that only those formally recognised as part of that or an equivalent assembly should break bread. Most Closed and some Open Brethren hold that association with evil defiles and that sharing the Communion meal can bring that association.

Their support text is from 1 Corinthians 15:33, "Do not be deceived: evil communications corrupt good manners." Among other distinctions, the Gospel Halls would generally not use musical instruments in their services, whereas many Chapels use them and may have singing groups, choirs, "worship teams" of musicians, etc. The Gospel Halls tend to be more conservative in dress; women do not wear trousers often, although they can and there is no scriptural objection in doing so, but most do not wear them in meetings and always have their heads covered, while in most Chapels women may wear whatever they wish, though modesty in dress serves as a guideline, and many continue the tradition of wearing a head covering taught in 1 Corinthians 11:2-13. Open Brethren churches are all independent, self-governing, local congregations with no central headquarters, although there are a number of seminaries, missions agencies, and publications that are widely supported by Brethren churches and which help to maintain a high degree of communication among them.

Henry K. Carroll performed an analysis of United States census data in 1912 to assign Roman numerals to various Brethren groups. For example, Brethren III is also known as the Lowe Brethren and the Elberfeld Brethren. Carroll's initial findings listed four sub-groups, identified as Brethren I-IV, but he expanded the number to six and then to eight; Arthur Carl Piepkorn expanded the number to ten. Those who have attempted to trace the realignments of the Plymouth Brethren include Ian McDowell and Massimo Introvigne. The complexity of the Brethren's history is evident in charts by McDowell and Ian McKay.

Definition

Both Open and Exclusive Brethren have historically been known as "Plymouth Brethren." That is still largely the case in some areas, such as North America. In some other parts of the world such as Australia and New Zealand, most Open Brethren shun the "Plymouth" label. This is mostly because of widespread negative media coverage of the Plymouth Brethren Christian Church, the most hardline branch of the Exclusive Brethren (and the only numerically significant Exclusive group in either country), which most Open Brethren consider to be a cult with which they do not wish to be misidentified.

Leadership
One of the most defining elements of the Brethren is the rejection of the concept of clergy. Their view is that all Christians are ordained by God to serve and therefore all are ministers, in keeping with the doctrine of the priesthood of all believers. The Brethren embrace the most extensive form of that idea, in that there is no ordained or unordained person or group employed to function as minister(s) or pastors. Brethren assemblies are led by the local church elders within any fellowship.

Historically, there is no office of pastor in most Brethren churches, because they believe that the term pastor (in Greek) as it is used in Ephesians 4:11 describes one of the gifts given to the church, rather than a specific office. In the words of Darby, these gifts in Ephesians 4:11 are "ministrations for gathering together and for edification established by Christ as Head of the body by means of gifts with which He endows persons as His choice." Therefore, there is no formal ordination process for those who preach, teach, or lead within their meetings. Men who become elders, or those who become deacons and overseers within the fellowship, have been recognized by others within the individual assemblies and have been given the blessing of performing leadership tasks by the elders.

An elder should be able and ready to teach when his assembly sees the "call of God" on his life to assume the office of elder. Brethren elders conduct many other duties that would typically be performed by the clergy in other Christian groups, including counselling those who have decided to be baptized, performing baptisms, visiting the sick, and giving spiritual counsel in general. Normally, sermons are given either by the elders or by men who regularly attend the Sunday meetings—but, again, only men whom the elders recognize as having the "call of God" on their lives for that particular ministry. Visiting speakers, however, are usually paid their travel costs and provided for with Sunday meals following the meetings.

Open and Exclusive Brethren differ in how they interpret the concept of no clergy. This position is also taken in some Baptist churches, especially Reformed Baptists, and by the Churches of Christ. It is understood that elders are appointed by the Holy Spirit (Acts 20:28) and are recognised as meeting the qualifications by the assembly and by previously existing elders. Generally, the elders themselves will look out for men who meet the biblical qualifications, and invite them to join them as elders. In some Open assemblies, elders are elected democratically, but this is a fairly recent development and is still relatively uncommon.

Officially naming and recognizing eldership is common to Open Brethren (cf. ), whereas many Exclusive Brethren assemblies believe that recognizing a man as an elder is too close to having clergy, and therefore a group of leading brothers, none of whom has an official title of any kind, attempts to present issues to the entire group for it to decide upon, believing that the whole group must decide, not merely a body of elders. Traditionally, only men are allowed to speak (and, in some cases, attend) these decision-making meetings, although not all assemblies follow that rule today.

The term elder is based on the same Scriptures that are used to identify bishops and overseers in other Christian circles, and some Exclusive Brethren claim that the system of recognition of elders by the assembly means that the Open Brethren cannot claim full adherence to the doctrine of the priesthood of all believers.

The Plymouth Brethren Christian Church, the most hardline of all the Exclusive Brethren groups, has developed into a de facto hierarchical body which operates under the headship of an Elect Vessel, currently Bruce Hales of Australia.

In place of an ordained ministry, an itinerant preacher often receives a "commendation" to the work of preaching and teaching that demonstrates the blessing and support of the assembly of origin. In most English-speaking countries, such preachers have traditionally been called full-time workers, labouring brothers, or on the Lord's work; in India, they are usually called Evangelists and very often are identified with Evg. in front of their name.

A given assembly may have any number of full-time workers, or none at all. In the last twenty years, many Open Assemblies in Australia,America, and New Zealand, and some elsewhere, have begun calling their full-time workers pastors, but this is not seen as ordaining clergy and does not connote a transfer of any special spiritual authority. In such assemblies, the pastor is simply one of several elders, and differs from his fellow-elders only in being salaried to serve full-time. Depending on the assembly, he may or may not take a larger share of the responsibility for preaching than his fellow elders.

UK government COVID-19 contracts 
Dozens of companies with connections to the Exclusive Brethren now known as the Plymouth Brethren Christian Church were awarded £2.2 billion in UK government COVID-19 contracts from the Department of Health and Social Care. This included providing Personal Protective Equipment (PPE). Several former members of the church have connections with the Conservative Party, and MPs have previously lobbied for the church to be given UK charitable status by the Charities Commission.

Missionary Work 
The Plymouth Brethren have been active in foreign missionary work, principally in Central Africa, India, and Latin America. Brethren are found throughout the English-speaking world and in most European countries. The movement spread to the US in the 1860's.

Notable Brethren
This list consists of mostly nineteenth-century figures who were associated with the Brethren movement before the 1848 schism. They are the leading historical figures common to both the Open and Exclusive Brethren. Two exceptions are H.A. Ironside and Watchman Nee, twentieth-century preachers who spent time associated with both the Open and Exclusive Brethren. See the respective articles for other more recent figures who have functioned primarily or entirely in either the Open Brethren or Exclusive Brethren:

 John Haigh - infamous serial killer, “The Acid Bath Killer”
 Robert Anderson – senior officer of Scotland Yard and Christian author; was a member of the Plymouth Brethren, first with Darby then with the Open Brethren party, before returning to his Presbyterian roots
 John Gifford Bellet – research fellow in classics at Trinity College, Cambridge.
 André Bergeron – French trade union leader
 George Beurling – Canadian WWII fighter pilot
 Robert Mackenzie Beverley – one of the most influential figures to abandon the Quakers and join the Brethren during the Beaconite controversy
 John Bodkin Adams – British general practitioner, convicted fraudster, and suspected serial killer.
 Lancelot Brenton – translator of the Greek-English edition of the Septuagint
 F. F. Bruce – British biblical scholar, author of 40 books and commentaries. (Open Brethren)
 Robert Chapman – prominent among the Plymouth Brethren in the 19th century
 Henry Craik – worked with George Müller in Bristol at Gideon and Bethesda Chapels from 1832
 Edward Cronin – pioneer of homeopathy and one of the original Dublin brethren
 Anthony Crosland – British Labour Party MP and Foreign Secretary from 1976 to 1977; grandson of F. E. Raven (Raven Exclusive Brethren).
 Aleister Crowley – British occultist, was raised in the movement until his father's death.
 John Nelson Darby – international preacher, writer, translator, hymn writer, and "father of dispensationalism"
 James George Deck – evangelist and missionary to New Zealand; officially associated with the Exclusives but refused to cut his ties to the Open Brethren.
 Jim Elliot – one of five missionaries killed while participating in Operation Auca
 Garrison Keillor - author and radio personality, left PB assemblies of his childhood
 Ken Follett – British novelist
 Emily Bowes Gosse – painter, illustrator, and author of religious tracts
 Philip Henry Gosse – naturalist and marine biologist
 Edmund Gosse – the son of Phillip and Emily Gosse who wrote Father and Son, about his relationship with his father and the religion.
 Anthony Norris Groves – missionary to Baghdad and India
 John Eliot Howard – chemist and quinologist
 Luke Howard – chemist and meteorologist, the "namer of clouds"
 Harry Ironside – Bible teacher, preacher, and author; pastor of the Moody Church in Chicago (1930–1948); associated at different times with both the Open and Exclusive Brethren
 William Kelly – prominent leader of the Exclusive Brethren in the late 19th century
 Charles Henry Mackintosh – 19th-century author of Christian books who published as C.H.M.
 George Müller – founder of the Bristol Orphanage and a stated teacher in Bethesda Chapel, Bristol
 Watchman Nee – leader in the "Little Flock" movement in China after being "put out" by Exclusive Brethren for "breaking bread with sectarians"
 Thomas Newberry – translator of the Newberry Reference Bible, which uses a system of symbols to explain verb tenses
 Francis William Newman – younger brother of Cardinal John Henry Newman; excommunicated for denying the Divinity of Christ
 Benjamin Wills Newton – early leader of the assembly in Plymouth; branded as a heretic by John Darby and his followers
 John Parnell, 2nd Baron Congleton – missionary to Mesopotamia
 G. H. Pember – English theologian who lived in the 19th century; wrote the book Earth's Earliest Ages
 Joseph M. Scriven – writer of the words to the hymn "What A Friend We Have In Jesus"
 Hudson Taylor – founder of the China Inland Mission
 Samuel Prideaux Tregelles – English biblical scholar and theologian
 William Edwy Vine – author of Vine's Expository Dictionary of Old and New Testament Words and numerous commentaries
 George Wigram – wrote a Greek and English Concordance to the New Testament and The Englishman's Hebrew and Chaldee Concordance of the Old Testament
 Orde Wingate – British commando

See also

Assemblies Jehovah Shammah
Exclusive Brethren
Gospel Hall Brethren or Gospel Hall Assemblies
Indian Brethren
Kerala Brethren Assembly
The Local Church (affiliation)
Needed Truth Brethren
Open Brethren
Plymouth Brethren Christian Church

Notes and references

Bibliography
 Adams, Norman (1972) Goodbye, Beloved Brethren. Impulse Publications Inc. 
 
 Carroll, H. K. (1912) Religious Forces in the United States. New York
 Coad, F. Roy (2001) A History of the Brethren Movement: Its Origins, Its Worldwide Development and Its Significance for the Present Day. Regent College Publishing 
 Dorman, W. H. (1866) The Close of Twenty-eight Years of Association with J. N. Darby. London: Houlston & Wright.  
  Ph.D. Thesis
 
 
 
 
 Ironside, H. A. (1985) Historical Sketch of the Brethren Movement Loizeaux Brothers , 1st edition 1942.
 Kelly, William (1883) Response by William Kelly to J. S. Teulon's Plymouth Brethren Free download site
 Lindsay, Thomas Martin (1885). "Plymouth Brethren", Encyclopædia Britannica, Ninth Edition. New York: Charles Scribner's Sons.
 Lindsay, Thomas Martin & Grieve, Alexander James (1911). "Plymouth Brethren", Encyclopædia Britannica, Eleventh Edition. New York: Encyclopædia Britannica, Inc.
 
 
 Pickering, Henry (1918) Chief Men Among the Brethren. London: Pickering & Inglis, 1918; Loizeaux Brothers, Inc. Neptune, NJ, 1996, 
 
 Smith, Natan Dylan (1996) Roots, Renewal and the Brethren. Hope Publishing House 
 Strauch, Alexander (1995) Biblical Eldership: an Urgent Call to Restore Biblical Church Leadership. Lewis & Roth Publishers 
 Stott, Rebecca (2017) In the Days of Rain: A Daughter, A Father, A Cult. Winner of the 2017 Costa Biography Prize. London: Fourth Estate. 
 Stunt, Timothy C. F. (2000) From Awakening to Secession: radical evangelicals in Switzerland and Britain, 1815–35. Edinburgh: T. & T. Clark 
 Taylor (1866) Biography of Henry Craik. London
 Teulon, J. S. (1883) The History and Teaching of The Plymouth Brethren. London Free download site

External links

Brethren Online
Plymouth Brethren (online library of Brethren authors)
The Brethren Writers Hall of Fame
BrethrenPedia
Brethren Archive (online archive of historical reference material related to all strands of 'Plymouth Brethren')
Brethren Archivists and Historians Network
Christian Brethren Archive (largest and most significant collection of Brethren archives, books, tracts and periodicals in the world) 
The Plymouth Brethren Movement History of, and Selected Ministry from, the 'Raven/Taylor' segment of the so-called Plymouth Brethren movement)
Bible. Darby Translation

 
1827 establishments in Ireland
19th century in Dublin (city)
Christian fundamentalism
Religious organizations established in 1827
Christianity